The Mexican ground squirrel (Ictidomys mexicanus) is a species of rodent in the family Sciuridae. It is found in Mexico and the United States. One of its closest relatives is the thirteen-lined ground squirrel (Ictidomys tridecemlineatus).

Description
The Mexican ground squirrel is a small to medium-sized rodent with nine rows of white spots on its back. It is about fifteen inches in length and the males are larger than the females. It also has small white circles of fur around its eyes and small ears.

Distribution and habitat
The Mexican ground squirrel is found in northern Mexico, the Texas Gulf Coast, western and central Texas, and southeastern New Mexico. The Mexican ground squirrel lives in flat, brushy, or grassy areas and usually prefers areas with gravelly or sandy soil or areas with that have mesquite.

While much of its original habitat has been destroyed by humans, it has adapted well to human civilization and can now be found on golf courses and other grassy areas such as the sides of highways. Each squirrel normally has more than one burrow and each of them have as many as five escape tunnels. The tunnels are not marked by a mound of dirt on top. Most burrows have a sleeping chamber for the offspring which is lined with grasses.

Diet
The Mexican ground squirrel is omnivorous, but eats primarily seeds and grains. Its diet includes seeds, nuts, grains, roots, bulbs, plant stems, leaves, mice, insects, and eggs. It often stores seeds, grains, and nuts in its cheeks pouches and takes them back to its den to eat later. In the summer it eats insects. It has also been documented seen eating roadkill.

Reproduction and hibernation
The mating season of the Mexican ground squirrel lasts from April to mid July, with a peak in May. Females can mate after their first season of hibernation. It is common for most Mexican ground squirrels to hibernate, but there have been cases where they have not. The species is normally solitary, but come together in groups during the mating season. It has been found that female hormone levels change during this period to allow the coming together of groups without aggression. During the mating season, The female will prepare a nesting chamber in her burrow and line it with mesquite and grass. The average litter size is five, but can range from one to ten.  The young are born toothless, without fur, and will stay with their mother for three months before leaving to live on their own.

Evading predation
The Mexican ground squirrel has evolved an interesting adaptation to help it survive after being attacked by some snakes. It has developed resistance to the venom of the western diamondback rattlesnake. The squirrel has an antihemorrhagic factor which neutralizes hemorrhagic activity of this specific species of rattlesnake. In addition, the squirrel's small, rear-pointing ears are effective for detecting predators.

References

Ictidomys
Mammals of Mexico
Mammals of the United States
Mammals described in 1777
Taxonomy articles created by Polbot